Bobby soxer may refer to:

 Bobby Soxer (singer), Burmese singer and actress
 Bobby soxer (music), fan of 1940s traditional pop music
 The Bachelor and the Bobby-Soxer, 1947 American comedy
 Bobby Sox Idol, a 1947 calypso song by Wilmoth Houdini about Frank Sinatra